Hestra is a locality situated in Gislaved Municipality, Jönköping County, Sweden with 1,306 inhabitants in 2010.

It is the origin of a company of the same name, Hestra, which designs and manufactures gloves.

References 

Populated places in Jönköping County
Populated places in Gislaved Municipality